Harry Hall may refer to:

 Harry Hall (painter) (c. 1814–1882),  English equestrian painter
 Harry Hall (footballer, born 1893) (1893–?), English footballer who played for Sheffield United
 Harry Hall (footballer, born 1889) (1889–?), English footballer who played for Southampton
 Harry Hall (footballer, born 1900) (1900–?), English footballer who played for Lincoln City and Darlington
 Harry Hall (Australian footballer) (1882–1967), Australian rules footballer
 Harry Hall (cricketer) (born 1970), English cricketer who played for Berkshire
 Harry Hall (botanist) (1906–1986), British born South African botanist

See also
Harold Hall (disambiguation)
Henry Hall (disambiguation)